The Battle of Coronea (also known as the First Battle of Coronea) took place between the Athenian-led Delian League and the Boeotian League in 447 BC during the First Peloponnesian War.

In 457 BC the Athenians had taken control of Boeotia at the Battle of Oenophyta, and spent the next ten years attempting to consolidate the League's power. In 454 BC Athens lost a fleet attempting to aid an Egyptian revolt against Persia; fearing revolts by the other members of the Delian League, Athens moved the treasury to their city from Delos in 453 BC, and signed the Peace of Callias with Persia around 450 BC. 

The Delian League was essentially an Athenian empire, and while Athens was usually successful at holding their possessions in the Aegean Sea, they were less successful on land. By 447 BC some of the men exiled from Boeotia after the Athenian victory there in 457 BC had returned home and began to take back some of the Boeotian towns. The Athenians under Tolmides, with 1,000 hoplites plus other troops from their allies, marched into Boeotia to take back the recaptured towns. They captured Chaeronea, but were attacked and defeated by the Boeotians at Coronea. The Athenians were forced to give up control of Boeotia. Boeotia was allowed to leave the Delian League in return for allowing the Athenians to leave Boeotia safely. The defeat led to revolts on Euboea and in Megara, which in turn led to further conflict with Sparta, contributing to the Peloponnesian War.

References
Thucydides 1.113 

Battle of Coronea in Robert J. Buck's History of Boetia

C.M. Bowra, The Epigram of the Fallen at Coronea 

J.A.O. Larsen, Orchomenus and the Formation of the Boeotian Confederacy in 447 B.C. 

Clifford J. Dull, Thucydides 1. 113 and the Leadership of Orchomenus

447 BC
440s BC conflicts
Coronea (447 BC)
Coronea 447 BC
Coronea 447 BC
Ancient Boeotia